Morris Goldwater (January 16, 1852 – April 11, 1939) was an American businessman and politician.

Background
Goldwater was born in London, England. In 1854, Goldwater and his family emigrated to the United States and settled in San Francisco, California. In 1867, Goldwater moved to La Paz, Arizona Territory to work in the mercantile business. Eventually, Goldwater moved to Prescott, Arizona Territory and opened the M. Goldwater & Bros. Store with his brothers Baron and Henry. Goldwater served on the Prescott City Council and as mayor. He also served on the Yavapai County, Arizona Board of Supervisors and was involved with the Democratic Party. Goldwater served on the board of school examiners for Yavapai County. In 1883 and 1898, Goldwater served on the Arizona Territorial Council and served as president of the territorial council in 1898. In 1910, Goldwater served in the Arizona Constitutional Convention. In 1914 and 1915, Goldwater served in the Arizona Senate and was the president of the senate in 1914. Goldwater died at his home in Prescott, Arizona. His nephew was United States Senator Barry Goldwater.

Notes

External links

1852 births
1939 deaths
English emigrants to the United States
English Jews
Politicians from Prescott, Arizona
Politicians from London
Businesspeople from Arizona
Mayors of Prescott, Arizona
Arizona city council members
County supervisors in Arizona
School board members in Arizona
Presidents of the Arizona Senate
Democratic Party Arizona state senators
American people of English-Jewish descent
American people of Polish-Jewish descent
Jewish American people in Arizona politics
Members of the Arizona Territorial Legislature
Barry Goldwater